The 1906 Giro di Lombardia was the second edition of the Giro di Lombardia cycle race and was held on 11 November 1906. The race started and finished in Milan. The race was won by Cesare Brambilla.

General classification

References

1906
Giro di Lombardia
Giro di Lombardia